Stenvers is a Dutch surname. Notable people with the surname include:

Björn Stenvers (born 1972), Dutch museum director
 (1889–1973), Dutch physician
Stenvers projection, oblique view of skull in radiology

Dutch-language surnames